Aníbal Bello is a paralympic athlete from Venezuela competing mainly in category F11 throws events.

Although Anibal competed in the javelin and shot at the 2004 Summer Paralympics it was only when he ran as part of the Venezuelan T11-13 4 × 100 m relay team that he won his only Paralympic medal, a bronze.

References

Paralympic athletes of Venezuela
Athletes (track and field) at the 2004 Summer Paralympics
Paralympic bronze medalists for Venezuela
Living people
Medalists at the 2004 Summer Paralympics
Year of birth missing (living people)
Paralympic medalists in athletics (track and field)
Medalists at the 2011 Parapan American Games
Medalists at the 2015 Parapan American Games
Venezuelan male sprinters
Venezuelan male shot putters
Venezuelan male javelin throwers
20th-century Venezuelan people
21st-century Venezuelan people